Orgest Serjani (born 11 November 1988) is an Albanian football player who most recently played as a midfielder for Dinamo Tirana in the Albanian First Division.

Club career
Serjani joined was promoted from the youth setup at Flamurtari Vlorë before the start of the 2008–2009 season. He had previously played for the youth teams at the club and had even won the league at under-18 level. The midfielder made his senior league debut on 22 February 2009 in a home match against champions of Albania, Dinamo Tirana. Serjani came on in the 73rd minute for Taulant Kuqi in the 2–0 loss. He made another 2 appearances during the 2008–2009 campaign, he also started both games and played the full 90 minutes against both KS Teuta Durres and Besa Kavaje in the last two games of the season.

He later played for Dinamo.

References

External links
 Profile - FSHF

1988 births
Living people
Footballers from Vlorë
Albanian footballers
Association football midfielders
Flamurtari Vlorë players
KF Apolonia Fier players
KF Vlora players
FK Dinamo Tirana players
Kategoria Superiore players
Kategoria e Parë players